Nadine Hansen is a lawyer from Cedar City, Utah notable for founding the website Mormonsfor8.com.

The Associated Press reported in 2009 that "...Hansen sought to identify Mormon donors of $1,000 or more, matching campaign records to tips from site visitors and church members and what she and others uncovered with search engines." Individual donors to political causes in the United States are not normally segregated according to religious preferences when donating to political campaigns.

Hansen has previously been notable for advocating for the ordination of women to the priesthood in the Mormon faith.

References

American lawyers
Living people
People from Cedar City, Utah
American women lawyers
Year of birth missing (living people)
21st-century American women